Casablanca Tit Mellil Airport  is an airport located in Tit Mellil, Morocco, near Casablanca.

References

Transport in Casablanca
Airports in Morocco
Buildings and structures in Casablanca-Settat